The 1995 Valencian regional election was held on Sunday, 28 May 1995, to elect the 4th Corts of the Valencian Community. All 89 seats in the Corts were up for election. The election was held simultaneously with regional elections in twelve other autonomous communities and local elections all throughout Spain.

As a result of the election, the People's Party (PP) increased its vote share by 15 percentage points relative to the 1991 Courts elections. For the first time, the PP had won a regional election, becoming the first party to poll more than 1 million votes in the area and gaining eleven seats, 3 short of an absolute majority. Most of the gains came from Spanish Socialist Workers' Party (PSOE), which lost 13 seats in the election. The regionalist Valencian Union (UV) also lost 1 seat, while United Left (IU) gained 4 seats to overtake UV as the third largest party.

A coalition agreement between the PP and UV was able to force the PSOE out from the Valencian Government after 12 years of Socialist rule. Eduardo Zaplana, the People's Party's candidate, became the second democratically elected President of the autonomous community

Overview

Electoral system
The Corts Valencianes were the devolved, unicameral legislature of the Valencian autonomous community, having legislative power in regional matters as defined by the Spanish Constitution and the Valencian Statute of Autonomy, as well as the ability to vote confidence in or withdraw it from a regional president.

Voting for the Corts was on the basis of universal suffrage, which comprised all nationals over 18 years of age, registered in the Valencian Community and in full enjoyment of their political rights. The 89 members of the Corts Valencianes were elected using the D'Hondt method and a closed list proportional representation, with a threshold of five percent of valid votes—which included blank ballots—being applied regionally. Parties not reaching the threshold were not taken into consideration for seat distribution. Seats were allocated to constituencies, corresponding to the provinces of Alicante, Castellón and Valencia, with each being allocated an initial minimum of 20 seats and the remaining 29 being distributed in proportion to their populations (provided that the seat-to-population ratio in any given province did not exceed three times that of any other).

The electoral law provided that parties, federations, coalitions and groupings of electors were allowed to present lists of candidates. However, groupings of electors were required to secure the signature of at least 1 percent of the electors registered in the constituency for which they sought election. Electors were barred from signing for more than one list of candidates. Concurrently, parties and federations intending to enter in coalition to take part jointly at an election were required to inform the relevant Electoral Commission within ten days of the election being called.

Election date
The term of the Corts Valencianes expired four years after the date of their previous election, with elections to the Corts being fixed for the fourth Sunday of May every four years. The previous election was held on 26 May 1991, setting the election date for the Corts on Sunday, 28 May 1995.

The Corts Valencianes could not be dissolved before the date of expiry of parliament.

Background
After 12 years of consecutive Socialist governments both in the Spanish national government and in the Valencian Community, the People's Party (PP) had managed to greatly increase its support from 1992–93, mostly at the cost of what remained of the Democratic and Social Centre (CDS). In the 1993 general election, the PP had already increased its vote share from 27.0% in 1989 to 40.5% and had overtaken the Spanish Socialist Workers' Party (PSOE) in the region for the first time. The party had also seen a dramatical rise in the 1994 European Parliament election, rising to 44.2% from 22.8% in 1989.

United Left (IU) had gained ground at the expense of the PSOE and in both the 1993 general and 1994 EP elections had polled more than 10% for the first time since the 1970s. After peaking in the 1991 Courts and local elections, the right-wing regional party Valencian Union (UV) had begun to lose ground in the 1993 and 1994 elections.

Population's weariness of PSOE's prolonged stay in power, economic crisis as well as the eruption of numerous corruption scandals at the national level had weakened the PSOE in the region to the point it was facing the possibility of a severe defeat for the first time in a decade. Joan Lerma's management of a wildfire crisis in the summer of 1994 came under heavy criticism, after the fire had resulted in the burning of 16% of the region's forest area.

Opinion polls
The table below lists voting intention estimates in reverse chronological order, showing the most recent first and using the dates when the survey fieldwork was done, as opposed to the date of publication. Where the fieldwork dates are unknown, the date of publication is given instead. The highest percentage figure in each polling survey is displayed with its background shaded in the leading party's colour. If a tie ensues, this is applied to the figures with the highest percentages. The "Lead" column on the right shows the percentage-point difference between the parties with the highest percentages in a poll. When available, seat projections determined by the polling organisations are displayed below (or in place of) the percentages in a smaller font; 45 seats were required for an absolute majority in the Corts Valencianes.

Results

Overall

Distribution by constituency

Aftermath

Notes

References
Opinion poll sources

Other

1995 in the Valencian Community
Valencian Community
Regional elections in the Valencian Community
May 1995 events in Europe